The 1985 Rutgers Scarlet Knights football team represented Rutgers University in the 1985 NCAA Division I-A football season. In their second season under head coach Dick Anderson, the Scarlet Knights compiled a 2–8–1 record while competing as an independent and were outscored by their opponents 266 to 149. The team's statistical leaders included Joe Gagliardi with 1,273 passing yards, Albert Smith with 362 rushing yards and 244 receiving yards.

Schedule

References

Rutgers
Rutgers Scarlet Knights football seasons
Rutgers Scarlet Knights football